Grigoraș (pronunciation: [ɡriɡoˈraʃ]) is a Romanian name that may refer to
Given name
Grigoraș Dinicu (1889–1949), Romanian violin player and composer 

Surname
Alexandru Grigoraș (born 1989), Romanian footballer 
Anca Grigoraș (born 1957), Romanian artistic gymnast 
Andrei Grigoraș (born 1989), Romanian futsal player 
Cristina Grigoraș (born 1990), Romanian rower 
Cristina Elena Grigoraş (born 1966), Romanian artistic gymnast
Demis Grigoraș (born 1993), Romanian handball player
Ioan Grigoraș (born 1963), Greco-Roman wrestler from Romania
Petre Grigoraș (born 1964), Romanian football manager and former player

Romanian-language surnames